Oliver Wilkin (born 6 April 1992) is an English cricketer.  Wilkin is a right-handed batsman who also keeps wicket.  He was born in Ealing, London and known for rarely leaving W5, W13

While studying for his degree in Materials Engineering at Loughborough University, Wilkin made his first-class debut for Loughborough MCCU against Northamptonshire in 2011.  He has made two further first-class appearances for Loughborough MCCU in 2011, against Leicestershire and Kent.  His three first-class appearances have so far seen him score 138 runs at an average of 23.00, with a high score of 38.  With the ball, he has taken 4 wickets at a bowling average of 53.25, with best figures of 2/63.

References

External links

1992 births
Living people
People from Ealing
Cricketers from Greater London
Alumni of Loughborough University
English cricketers
Middlesex cricketers
Loughborough MCCU cricketers
Berkshire cricketers